Marcus Choleva (born 12 April 1933) is a Danish businessman. He was CEO of  KFI (Købmændenes Finansieringsinstitut) from 1970 until 2012.

Early life and education
Marcus Choleva was born on 12 April 1933 in the Frederiksberg district of Copenhagen to parents of Latvian-Polish Jewish descent. His great-grandparents fled Eastern Europe due to rekindled anti-Semitism. His family was arrested by the Gestapo during World War II and subsequently sent to the concentration camp Theresienstadt in present-day Czech Republic. The Danish Jews in Theresienstadt were treated better than other European Jews in the concentration camp, and were not immediately deported to death camps like many of the other European Jews in the camp. Marcus Choleva and most of his family spent a year and a half in the concentration camp, surviving the Holocaust. Back in Denmark after the war, Choleva completed a Master's Degree in Economics at University of Copenhagen.

Career
Marcus Choleva  initially worked for the bank Privatbanken and later for the Ministry of Finance. From 1970 he was CEO of Købmændenes Finansieringsinstitut (KFI). He left the company in 2012 and has later realized large profits on real estate investments.

Philanthropist 
Marcus Choleva has donated a considerable amount of money and a vase of remembrance to the Israeli Holocaust museum, Yad Vashem.

Private life
Choleva  has four children. He lives on an estate outside Birkerød.

References

External links
 KFI's official website; in Danish
 radio interview; in Danish
 P1 Business: Marcus Choleva, article; in Danish
 Den benhårde forretningsmand, Business.dk, October 4, 2006

20th-century Danish businesspeople
21st-century Danish businesspeople
Danish billionaires
Businesspeople from Copenhagen
University of Copenhagen alumni
People from Frederiksberg
Danish Jews
Danish people of Latvian-Jewish descent
Danish people of Polish-Jewish descent
1933 births
Living people